Polycera fujitai is a species of sea slug, a nudibranch, a shell-less marine gastropod mollusc in the family Polyceridae.

Distribution 
This species was described from Japan. It also occurs in Hong Kong, in the South China Sea and has been reported from New Zealand.

References

External links
 

Polyceridae
Gastropods described in 1937